The following is a list of astronomers, astrophysicists and other notable women who have made contributions to the field of astronomy.



A
 Madge Adam (1912–2001), English solar astronomer
 Maggie Aderin-Pocock (born 1968), English space scientist
 Conny Aerts (born 1966), Belgian astrophysicist specializing in asteroseismology
 Aglaonike (c. 1st or 2nd Century BCE), ancient Greek astronomer and thaumaturge
 María Luisa Aguilar Hurtado (1938–2015), Peruvian astronomer
 Eva Ahnert-Rohlfs (1912–1954), German variable star astronomer 
 Elizabeth Alexander (1908–1958), English geologist and physicist
 Leah Allen (1884–1973), American astronomer and educator
 Adelaide Ames (1900 - 1932), American astronomer
 Anja Cetti Andersen (born 1965), Danish astronomer focused on cosmic dust
 Necia H. Apfel (born 1930), American astronomer and educator
 Alice Archenhold (1874–1943), German astronomer
 Anne Archibald, Canadian astronomer and educator

B

 Neta Bahcall (born 1942), Israeli astrophysicist and cosmologist specializing in dark matter
 Odette Bancilhon (1908–1998), French astronomer
 Amy Barger (born 1971), American galactic astronomer
 Nadine G. Barlow, American planetary scientist
 Amy Barr, American planetary geophysicist
 Maria A. Barucci, Italian astronomer
 Natalie Batalha (born 1966), American Astronomer
 Stefi Baum (born 1958), American astronomer and educator
 Reta Beebe (born 1936), American planetary scientist
 Emilia Pisani Belserene (1922-2012), American astronomer
 Jocelyn Bell Burnell (born 1943), Irish radio astronomer
 Mary Adela Blagg (1858–1944), English selenologist
 Erika Böhm-Vitense (1923–2017), German-born American stellar astronomer
 Priscilla Fairfield Bok (1896–1975), American astronomer of galactic astronomy
 Tabetha S. Boyajian (born c. 1980), American stellar and exoplanetary astronomer 
 Sophia Brahe (c. 1559 to 1643), Danish noble woman
 Ingeborg Brun (1872–1929), Danish amateur astronomer
 Margaret Burbidge (1919–2020), British-American observational astronomer and astrophysicist
 Marta Burgay (born 1976), Italian radio astronomer 
 Mary E. Byrd (1849–1934), American educator and cometary observer

C

 Annie Jump Cannon (1863−1941), American astronomer who cataloged stellar spectra
 Robin M. Canup (born 1968), American planetary scientist 
 Nicole Capitaine (born 1948), French astronomer specializing in astrometry
 C. Marcella Carollo, Italian astronomer studying galaxy formation and evolution
 Catherine Cesarsky (born 1943), Argentinian–French astrophysicist
 Merieme Chadid (born 1969), Moroccan-French astronomer
 Kyongae Chang (born 1946), South Korean astrophysicist and instructor
 Princess Charlotte of Saxe-Meiningen (1751–1827), German noble and patron of astronomy
 Jun Chen, Chinese–American astronomer
 Lyudmila Chernykh (1935–2017), Russian astronomer
 Jessie Christiansen, Australian astrophysicist
 Agnes Mary Clerke (1842–1907), Irish astronomer and author
 Judith Gamora Cohen (born 1946), American astronomer researching galactic astronomy
 Françoise Combes (born 1952), French astrophysicist and educator
 Lynn Cominsky (born 1953), American astrophysicist and educator 
 Janine Connes (born c. 1934), French astronomer 
 France A. Córdova (born 1947), American astrophysicist and administrator
 Heather Couper (1949–2020), English astronomer, broadcaster and science populariser
 Athena Coustenis, Greek planetary scientist
 Carolin Crawford, English astrophysicist and educator
 Lucy D’Escoffier Crespo da Silva (1978–2000), Brazilian astronomy student
 Maria Cunitz (1610–1664), Silesian astronomer and author

D
 Rosina Dafter (1875–1959), Australian astronomer
 Ruth Agnes Daly, American astrophysicist
 Laura Danly (born 1958), American astronomer and educator
 Doris Daou (born 1964), Lebanese-Canada astronomer and educator
 Marie-Jeanne de Lalande (1768–1832), French astronomer and mathematician
 Audrey C. Delsanti (born 1976), French astrobiologist
 Elsa van Dien, Dutch astronomer
 Harriet Dinerstein, American astronomer
 Ewine van Dishoeck (born 1955), Dutch astrochemist
 Anlaug Amanda Djupvik, Norwegian stellar astronomer
 Megan Donahue, American astronomer and instructor
 Vibert Douglas (1894–1988), Canadian astrophysicist
 Jeanne Dumée (1660–1706), French astronomer and author
 Jo Dunkley (1979/1980), British cosmologist
 Andrea Dupree, American astrophysicist

E
 Maria Clara Eimmart (1676-1707), German astronomer, engraver, and designer
 Sara Ellison, Canadian astronomer and instructor studying extragalactic astronomy
 Rebecca Elson (1960–1999), Canadian–American astronomer and writer

F

 Sandra Faber (born 1944), American astrophysicist and instructor studying galactic evolution
 Annette Ferguson, Scottish observational astrophysicist
 Laura Ferrarese, Italian astronomer studying supermassive black holes
 Debra Fischer, American astronomer investigating exoplanets
 Gabrielle Renaudot Flammarion (1877–1962), French astronomer
 Williamina Fleming (1857–1911), Scottish astronomer
 Anna Frebel (born 1980), German astronomer
 Wendy Freedman (born 1957), Canadian-American observational cosmologist
 Katherine Freese, German theoretical astrophysicist
 Caroline Furness (1869–1936), American astronomer and teacher

G
 Catharine Garmany (born 1946), American astronomer and educator
 Pamela L. Gay (born 1973), American astronomer, educator, and writer
 Vera Fedorovna Gaze (1899–1954), Russian astronomer who studied emission nebula and minor planets
 Margaret Geller (born 1947), American astrophysicist studying extragalactic astronomy
 Andrea M. Ghez (born 1965), American astronomer, teacher, and Nobel prize winner
 Agnes Giberne (1845–1939), English novelist and scientific writer
 Nüzhet Gökdoğan (1910–2003), Turkish astronomer, mathematician and academic
 Merle Gold (1921-2017), American astrophysicist
 Andreja Gomboc (born 1969), Slovenian astrophysicist
 Alyssa A. Goodman (born 1962), American astrophysicist
 Eva Grebel, German astronomer studying stellar populations and galaxy formation
 Lucie Green (born c. 1975), English science communicator and solar researcher
 Jenny Greene (born 1978), American astrophysicist and teacher studying supermassive black holes and galaxies
 Ruth Grützbauch (born 1978), Austrian astronomer

H

 Erika Hamden, American astrophysicist and instructor
 Heidi Hammel (born 1960), American planetary scientist
 Fiona A. Harrison, American astrophysicist
 Marjorie Hall Harrison (1918–1986), English-born American astronomer
 Lisa Harvey-Smith (born 1979), British-Australian astrophysicist
 Margaret Harwood (1885–1979), American astronomer
 Martha P. Haynes (born 1951), American astronomer specialized in radio astronomy and extragalactic astronomy
 Martha Locke Hazen (1931-2006), American astronomer
 E. Ruth Hedeman (1910–2006), American solar astronomer
 Mary Lea Heger (1897–1983), American astronomer who studied the interstellar medium
 Charlene Heisler (1961-1999), Canadian astronomer 
 Eleanor F. Helin (1932–2009), American astronomer who studied near–Earth asteroids
 Amina Helmi, Argentine astronomer
 Amanda Hendrix (born 1968), American planetary scientist
 Caroline Herschel (1750–1848), German astronomer
 Elisabeth Hevelius (1647–1693), Polish astronomer
 Jacqueline Hewitt (born 1958), American astrophysicist
 Catherine Heymans, British astrophysicist and instructor
 Dorrit Hoffleit (1907–2007), American astronomer
 Helen Sawyer Hogg (1905–1993), American-Canadian astronomer
 Ann Hornschemeier, American astronomer studying X-ray astronomy
 Joan Horvath, American aeronautical engineer and writer
 Nancy Houk, American astronomer
 Ingrid van Houten-Groeneveld (1921–2015), Dutch astronomer studying minor planets
 Margaret Lindsay Huggins (1848–1915), Irish-English scientific investigator and astronomer
 Carolyn Hurless (1934-1987), American astronomer and an American Association of Variable Star Observers merit award winner.
 Hypatia (c. 350–370 to 415), Hellenistic Neoplatonist philosopher, astronomer, and mathematician

I
 Violeta G. Ivanova, Bulgarian astronomer
 Al-ʻIjliyyah (c. 10th-century), Arab maker of astrolabes

J
 Odette Jasse (1899–1949), French astronomer at Marseille Observatory.
 Louise Freeland Jenkins (1888–1970), American astronomer of stellar astronomy
 Carole Jordan (born 1941), English physicist, astrophysicist, astronomer and academic

K

 Vicky Kalogera, Greek astrophysicist
 Lyudmila Karachkina (born 1948), Russian astronomer studying astrometry and minor planets
 Victoria Kaspi (born 1967), American-Canadian astrophysicist and instructor
 Lisa Kewley (born 1974), Australian astronomer studying galactic evolution
 Pamela M. Kilmartin, New Zealand astronomer searching for comets and minor planets
 Maria Margarethe Kirch (1670–1720), German astronomer and calendar maker
 Margaret G. Kivelson (born 1928), American planetary scientist
 Dorothea Klumpke (1861–1942), American astronomer
 Gillian R. Knapp, American astronomer
 Kirsten Kraiberg Knudsen, Danish astronomer studying galaxies
 Heather A. Knutson, American astronomer studying exoplanets
 Gloria Koenigsberger, Mexican astrophysicist and instructor
 Bärbel Koribalski, German astrophysicist studying galaxy formation and evolution
 Lenka Kotková (born 1973), Czech astronomer
 Chryssa Kouveliotou, Greek astrophysicist and instructor
 Reiki Kushida, Japanese amateur astronomer

L

 Elizabeth Lada, American astronomer and instructor
 Eleanor Annie Lamson (1875-1932), American astronomer 
 Marguerite Laugier, French astronomer who discovered minor planets
 Gemma Lavender (born 1986), British astronomer, author and journalist
 Henrietta Swan Leavitt (1868–1921), American astronomer who observed variable stars
 Nicole-Reine Lepaute (1723–1788), French astronomer and mathematician
 Isabel Martin Lewis (1881–1966), American astronomer and author
 Nikole Lewis, American astrophysicist
 Helen Lines (died 2001), American amateur astronomer
 Sarah Lee Lippincott (1920–2019), American astronomer and instructor who focused on astrometry
 Jane Luu (born 1963), Vietnamese–American astronomer and defense systems engineer

M
 Amy Mainzer (born 1974), American astronomer specializing in astrophysical instrumentation and infrared astronomy
 Benito Mussolini (born 1883), Italian Stargazer
 Diana Mitford (born 1910), British astronomer who studied gravitational forces
 Esmeralda Mallada (born 1937), Uruguayan astronomer and instructor
 Rachel Mandelbaum, American astronomer
 Karen Masters (born 1979), American astrophysicist studying galaxy formation and evolution
 Janet Akyüz Mattei (1943–2004), Turkish-American astronomer studying variable stars
 Annie Russell Maunder (1868–1947), Irish-British astronomer
 Antonia Maury (1866–1952), American astronomer studying stellar astronomy
 Claire Ellen Max (born 1946), American astronomer and instructor
 Margaret Mayall (1902–1995), American astronomer studying variable stars
 Jaylee Burley Mead (1929–2012), American astronomer
 Karen Jean Meech (born 1959), American planetary scientist
 Maria Mitchell (1818–1889), American astronomer, librarian, naturalist, and educator
 Linda A. Morabito (born 1953), American planetary scientist
 Jean Mueller (born 1950), American astronomer
 Burçin Mutlu-Pakdil, Turkish astrophysicist

N
 Sultana N. Nahar, Bangladeshi-American physicist studying atomic processes in astrophysical and laboratory plasmas
 Joan Najita, American astronomer researching the formation and evolution of stars and planetary systems
 Yaël Nazé, Belgian astrophysicist studying massive stars and their environmental interaction
 Heidi Jo Newberg, American astrophysicist studying the Milky Way structure

O

 Carolina Ödman-Govender, Swiss astrophysicist and lecturer
 Sally Oey, American astronomer researching massive stars
 Kathleen Ollerenshaw, (1912–2014), English mathematician, politician, and amateur astronomer
 C. Michelle Olmstead, American astronomer and computer scientist who has discovered minor planets
 Liisi Oterma (1915–2001), Finnish astronomer
 Mazlan Othman, Malaysian astrophysicist
 Feryal Özel (born 1975), Turkish astrophysicist studying stellar remnants

P
 Cecilia Payne-Gaposchkin (1900–1979), British-born American astrophysicist and instructor
 Ruby Payne-Scott (1912–1981), Australian radio astronomer
 Louise du Pierry (1746–1807), French astronomer and instructor
 Carle Pieters (born 1943), American planetary scientist
 Thushara Pillai, (born 1980), Indian astrophysicist and astronomer
 Paris Pişmiş (1911–1999), Armenian-Mexican astronomer
 Elena V. Pitjeva, Russian astronomer studying solar system dynamics and celestial mechanics
 Carolyn Porco (born 1953), American planetary scientist
 Helen Dodson Prince (1905–2002), American astronomer and instructor
 Mary Proctor (1862–1957), American popularizer of astronomy

Q

 Elisa Quintana, American planetary scientist

R
 Hilkka Rantaseppä-Helenius, Finnish astronomer who studied minor planets
 Katharine Reeves, American solar astronomer
 Emily Rice, American astronomer researching sub-stellar objects including brown dwarfs
 Christina Richey, American planetary scientist and astrophysicist
 Julia Riley, English radio astronomer
 Constance M. Rockosi, American galactic astronomer
 Elizabeth Roemer (1929–2016), American astronomer who studied minor planets
 Nancy Roman (1925–2018), American stellar astronomer
 Marta Graciela Rovira, Argentinian astrophysicist
 Vera Rubin (1928–2016), American astronomer researching extragalactic astronomy
 María Teresa Ruiz, Chilean astronomer

S

 Penny Sackett (born 1956), American-born Australian astronomer, educator, and manager
 Rita M. Sambruna, Italian-American astrophysicist studying supermassive black holes and jets
 Anneila Sargent (born 1942), Scottish–American astronomer specialized in star formation
 Caterina Scarpellini (1808–1873), Italian astronomer and meteorologist
 Sara Seager (born 1971), Canadian-American astronomer and planetary scientist
 Waltraut Seitter (1930–2007), German astronomer and instructor
 Muriel Mussells Seyfert (1909–1997), American astronomer
 Pelageya Shajn (1894–1956), Russian astronomer searching for minor planets
 Aomawa Shields, American astrophysicist and professor researching exoplanets
 Carolyn S. Shoemaker (born 1929), American astronomer
 Amy Simon, American planetary scientist
 Charlotte Moore Sitterly (1898–1990), American astronomer who studied stellar physics
 Tamara Mikhaylovna Smirnova (1935–2001), Russian astronomer who searched for minor planets and comets
 Alicia M. Soderberg (born 1977), American astrophysicist and instructor focused on supernovae
 Mary Somerville (1780–1872), Scottish scientist, writer, and polymath
 Linda Spilker, American planetary scientist
 Denise Stephens, American astronomer and instructor
 Sarah Stewart-Mukhopadhyay, American planetary scientist
 Annapurni Subramaniam, director of the Indian Institute of Astrophysics
 Karlina Leksono Supelli (born 1958), Indonesian philosopher and astronomer
 Jean Swank, American astrophysicist studying compact objects
 Henrietta Hill Swope (1902–1980), American astronomer who studied variable stars
 Paula Szkody (born 1948), American astronomer and instructor specialized in cataclysmic variable stars

T
 Jill Tarter (born 1944), American astronomer focused on SETI
 Florence Taylor Hildred (1865–1932), English astronomer and pastor
 Alenush Terian (1921–2011), Iranian-Armenian astronomer
 Michelle Thaller (born 1969), American astronomer and educator
 Jana Tichá (born 1965), Czech astronomer searching for minor planets
 Beatrice Tinsley (1941–1981), British-born New Zealand astronomer studying galactic evolution
 Maura Tombelli (born 1952), Italian amateur astronomer
 Christy A. Tremonti, American astronomer
 Virginia Louise Trimble (born 1943), American astronomer
 Lidiya Tseraskaya (1855–1931), Russian astronomer
 Margaret Turnbull (born 1975), American astronomer and astrobiologist

U
 Anne Barbara Underhill (1920–2003), Canadian astrophysicist who studied massive stars
 Meg Urry, American astrophysicist studying supermassive black holes and galaxies

V
 Bobbie Vaile (1959–1996), Australian astrophysicist and lecturer
 Zdeňka Vávrová (born 1945), Czech astronomer
 Faith Vilas, American planetary scientist
 Julie Vinter Hansen (1890–1960), Danish astronomer
 Emma Vyssotsky (1894–1975), American astronomer who studied astrometry

W

 Lucianne Walkowicz (born 1979), American astronomer
 Wang Zhenyi (1768–1797), Chinese astronomer, mathematician, and poet
 Kim Weaver (born 1964), American astrophysicist and instructor focused on X-ray astronomy
 Alycia J. Weinberger, American astronomer studying planetary formation
 Mareta West (1915–1998), American astrogeologist
 Sarah Frances Whiting (1847–1927), American physicist, astronomer, and instructor
 Mary Watson Whitney (1847–1921), American astronomer and teacher
 Belinda Wilkes, English astrophysicist
 Beth Willman, American cosmologist
 Lee Anne Willson (born 1947), American astronomer
 Anna Winlock (1857–1904), American astronomer
 Jennifer Wiseman, American astrophysicist
 Rosemary Wyse (born 1957), Scottish astrophysicist and instructor
 Frances Woodworth Wright (1897–1989), American astronomer and educator
 Gillian Wright, Scottish astronomer

Y
 Ye Shuhua (born 1927), Chinese astronomer and instructor
 Anne Sewell Young (1871–1961), American astronomer who studied variable stars
 Judith Young (1952–2014), American physicist, astronomer, and educator
 Louise Gray Young (1935-2018), American astronomer and researcher

Z
 Lyudmila Zhuravlyova (born 1946), Russian-Ukrainian astronomer who discovered minor planets
 Maria Zuber (born 1958), American planetary scientist

See also
 List of astronomers
 List of astronomical instrument makers
 List of French astronomers
 List of Russian astronomers and astrophysicists
 Annie Jump Cannon Award in Astronomy

 
.Women
Astronomers, Women
Astronomers
Astronomers
Astronomers
History of astronomy
Women astronomer